Unity Bridge (World Guide Number 37-20-170) is an historic  long covered bridge over Fall Creek at Unity near Lowell in Lane County, Oregon, United States. Also known as Unity Covered Bridge and Unity Creek Bridge, it was built in 1936 at a cost $4,400 by Lane County using the Howe truss system. Its east side features a full-length window with its own roof so that drivers can see oncoming cars.

The Unity Bridge was preceded by a covered bridge built in 1890. Limited to foot-traffic only after 1936, it was removed in 1953. The Unity Bridge, which replaced the original bridge, is  further upstream.

County officials temporarily closed the bridge for repairs in 1986. Work included a new floor, exterior painting, repair of piers and guardrails, and vandalism cleanup.

The bridge carries Lowell–Unity Road over the creek. Unity Bridge was added to the National Register of Historic Places in 1979.

See also 
 List of bridges on the National Register of Historic Places in Oregon
 List of Oregon covered bridges

References

National Register of Historic Places in Lane County, Oregon
Covered bridges in Lane County, Oregon
Bridges completed in 1936
1936 establishments in Oregon
Covered bridges on the National Register of Historic Places in Oregon
Road bridges on the National Register of Historic Places in Oregon
Wooden bridges in Oregon
Howe truss bridges in the United States